Thomas Jefferson Young (September 6, 1902 - December 27, 1964) was a Negro leagues catcher who played mostly for the Kansas City Monarchs. He also played for other teams.

Young was native of Wetumpka, Alabama. He was the older brother of fellow Negro leaguer Maurice Young. He died in Seattle, Washington in 1964 at age 62.

References

External links
 and Baseball-Reference Black Baseball stats and Seamheads
 

Baseball players from Oklahoma
1902 births
1964 deaths
Detroit Wolves players
Homestead Grays players
Kansas City Monarchs players
Newark Eagles players
Philadelphia Stars players
Pittsburgh Crawfords players
St. Louis Stars (baseball) players
Negro league baseball managers
African-American baseball players
20th-century African-American sportspeople